Lynn A. Thompson (10 June 1940 – 5 October 2021) was the President of the Priesthood of the Apostolic United Brethren (AUB), a fundamentalist Mormon sect, from September 2, 2014 until October 5, 2021.

Apostolic United Brethren
Thompson had been a member of the AUB's Priesthood Council under the leadership of Owen A. Allred and J. LaMoine Jenson. He assumed leadership of the Bluffdale, Utah church, following the 2014 death of Jenson. Lynn Thompson died October 5, 2021.

Allegations of abuse
In November 2014, Rosemary Williams, daughter of Thompson and cast member of the television show My Five Wives, accused Thompson of molesting her more than two decades ago. She said she remembered that he fondled her once when she was 12 years old. However, Rosemary stated that she did not plan to file a lawsuit or a criminal accusation as "she doesn't think it will do any good."

In response, Thompson denied the allegations when contacted by the Associated Press.  AUB spokesman David Watson stated that the allegations against Thompson were being investigated by "other leaders in the church" and that "if there's criminal allegations that need to be turned over to local authorities, that's what we do."

See also
List of Mormon fundamentalist leaders

References

American Latter Day Saint leaders
Mormon fundamentalist leaders
Living people
Apostolic United Brethren
People from Salt Lake County, Utah
1940 births